Laura Jean is the fourth album by Melbourne folk singer-songwriter Laura Jean. The album, produced by PJ Harvey collaborator John Parish, was released in August 2014.

The album was included in the Sydney Morning Herald's list of the top 20 albums of the year.

Track listing
(All songs by Laura Jean)
 "June" – 3:05
 "How Will I Know When I'm Home?"  – 3:57
 "First Love Song"   – 4:54
 "Sister, All I Have Are My Arms" – 3:33
 "Here Comes the Miner" – 4:04
 "When I First Brought Him Home" – 6:28
 "Kelpie Blues"  – 1:12
 "Don't Marry the One You Love"   – 2:56
 "A Mirror on the Earth"  – 5:51
 "Prince of Kites"  – 2:16

Personnel

Laura Jean Englert — vocals, guitars, synth, piano, percussion, autoharp, bass
John Parish — drums, banjo, trombone, bass, pedal steel, organ, piano accordion, cymbal, backing vocals
 Ali Chant — engineering, mixing, drum machine
Jenny Hval — backing vocals

References

2014 albums
Laura Jean albums